Tryblidiopsis ( Triblidiopsis) is a genus of fungi within the Rhytismataceae family.

References

External links 

 Tryblidiopsis at Index Fungorum

Leotiomycetes